The 1908 New Mexico A&M Aggies football team was an American football team that represented New Mexico College of Agriculture and Mechanical Arts (now known as New Mexico State University) during the 1908 college football season.  In their first and only year under head coach William G. Hummell, the Aggies compiled a 4–2 record and outscored opponents by a total of 179 to 42. The team played its home games on Miller Field.

Schedule

References

New Mexico AandM
New Mexico State Aggies football seasons
New Mexico AandM Aggies football